The Monte Albo cave salamander or Stefani's salamander (Speleomantes flavus) is a species of salamander in the family Plethodontidae,  endemic to Sardinia.

Its natural habitats are temperate forests, rocky areas, caves, and subterranean habitats (other than caves) in the vicinity of streams. The preferred habitat often has a good covering of damp moss. It reproduces through the direct development of a few terrestrial eggs

It is threatened by habitat loss.

References

Amphibians of Europe
Speleomantes
Cave salamanders
Endemic fauna of Sardinia
Fauna of Sardinia
Amphibians described in 1969
Taxonomy articles created by Polbot